Charlotte Tilbury Beauty Ltd is a cosmetics company registered in the United Kingdom. It was founded in 2013 by Charlotte Tilbury, a British makeup artist who is also chair. The company is headquartered in Surrey Street, London in the United Kingdom. The current CEO is Lady Demetra Pinsent. In 2018, Charlotte Tilbury Beauty Ltd had a revenue of £100.9 million.

Charlotte Tilbury products are available in 76 countries and are largely sold in retail stores for personal care and beauty products. These include multinational companies like Cult Beauty, Sephora, Bloomingdales, and ASOS. The brand is available in retail stores in Canada, France, Germany, Hong Kong, Ireland, Kuwait, Macau Sar, Netherlands, Qatar, Spain, United Arab Emirates, United Kingdom, Italy and United States.

History
Charlotte Tilbury founded the company in September 2013, with a collection of 200 products. Charlotte Tilbury Beauty Ltd products became available in the United States in 2014.

In 2019, Charlotte Tilbury Beauty Ltd pledged £1 million to Women for Women International, for whom Tilbury herself is an ambassador.

On 23 June 2020, Spanish cosmetics and fragrance company Puig acquired a majority stake in the business for £1.3 billion through Prado Investments Limited, a London-based subsidiary. Prior to this, founder Charlotte Tilbury who was thought to own a stake of between 50 and 75%.

Copyright lawsuit
In 2019, Islestarr Holdings Limited, the then-owner of the Charlotte Tilbury brand, was successful in a copyright infringement lawsuit against the discount supermarket store Aldi who sold a similar product to Tilbury's 'Filmstar Bronze and Glow' palette, which launched in 2013. The lawsuit made two claims of infringement in regard to the Starburst Design style of the packaging and the Powder Design style embossed in the powder's surface. Aldi launched its product in July 2018, with a similar packaging design and similar design embossed in the power. The Aldi 'Broadway Shape and Glow' palette sold for £6.99 while Charlotte Tilbury 'Filmstar Bronze and Glow' palette sold for £39. Aldi made approximately £140,000 from sales of their palette prior to the claim being brought.

Aldi admitted to having been aware of Tilsbury's designs. The High Court of England and Wales granted summary judgment in favor of Islestarr Holdings Limited on the basis the designs were remarkably similar.

Marketing strategy
Charlotte Tilbury works with celebrity clients such as Kate Bosworth, Salma Hayek, Sofia Vergara, and Kate Moss. Moss is also godparent to Tilbury's children.

The participation of celebrity clients and friends are a large part of Charlotte Tilbury Beauty's marketing strategy. Bella Hadid was just recently named face of the brand.  These celebrities often appear on Tilbury's YouTube Channel and Instagram. Tilbury has used social media to expand her company. During the Covid-19 pandemic, Tilbury developed a series of live streams called 'Charlotte's Beauty Happy Hour' which included Miranda Kerr, Idris Elba, Sofia Vergara and Dame Joan Collins discussing life lessons and inspiring experiences. Tilbury has also named the shades in the Hot Lips lipsticks line after celebrity clients.The brand announced Michaela Jaé Rodriguez as Charlotte’s first American beauty muse in 2023. 

Tilbury markets her products through an ethnically ambiguous lens to attract a wide range of consumers.

Awards 
In 2014, Charlotte Tilbury Beauty Ltd won a Walpole Award for Emerging British Luxury Brand. In 2017, Charlotte Tilbury Beauty won the Indy Brand Beauty Award by CEW.  In 2019, two of Charlotte Tilbury Beauty Ltd's products won Vogue Beauty Awards.

References 

Puig
British brands
British companies established in 2013
Chemical companies established in 2013
Cosmetics companies of the United Kingdom
Cosmetics brands
Companies based in London
2013 establishments in the United Kingdom